Nikolay Nikolayevich Serebryakov (14 December 1928, Leningrad – 9 August 2005, Moscow) was a Soviet and Russian director of animated films and a People's Artist of Russia (1996). He was married twice; first, he married Nadia Speshnayova, but she died on April 19, 1984.  He then married her sister Alina Speshnayova. He had one child with her.

External links

1928 births
2005 deaths
Russian film directors
Soviet film directors
Russian animators
People's Artists of Russia
Mass media people from Saint Petersburg
Burials in Troyekurovskoye Cemetery